Adolf Gustav Stephan Smekal (12 September 1895 – 7 March 1959) was an Austrian theoretical physicist, with interests in solid state physics, known for the prediction of the inelastic scattering of photons (the Raman effect).

Adolf Smekal studied at the Vienna College of Technology (1912–1913), received his doctorate from the University of Graz (1913–1917), and then studied at the University of Berlin (1917–1919).

References

1895 births
1959 deaths
Austrian physicists
TU Wien alumni
University of Graz alumni
Humboldt University of Berlin alumni
Academic staff of the University of Graz
Academic staff of the University of Vienna
Academic staff of the University of Halle